Klængur Þorsteinsson (110228 February 1176;;) was an Icelandic Catholic clergyman, who became the fifth bishop of Iceland from 1152 to 1176. He served in the diocese of Skálholt.

See also
List of Skálholt bishops

References

External links

12th-century Roman Catholic bishops in Iceland
1102 births
1176 deaths
Place of birth unknown
Place of death unknown
Date of birth unknown
12th-century Icelandic people